Monument of Artyomka (Russian: Памятник «Артёмка»)  is the sculptural composition in Taganrog created by the sculptor David Begalov in honor of the famous literary hero of the writer I.D. Vasilenko.

Sculptural composition
Bronze figure of a barefoot boy in a cap is installed on the pedestal in raw granite boulder. In his right hand he squeezes a small box, described in the opening story by Ivan Vasilenko "The Magic box" (1937)

Creation history
The monument to the literary hero Artyomka of  Ivan Vasilenko  was opened in Taganrog in May, 2010 in front of the House-Museum of the writer to the address Chekhov St., 88. The Opening was timed to the 115 anniversary since the birth of the writer. Pupils of Children's school of arts and Children's art school of Blonskaya have prepared an exhibition of drawings according to works by the writer. The best artists were entrusted with the honour of opening the monument

Vandalism
On the night of September 13, 2010, the monument along with the pedestal was turned upside down by unknown vandals and its head was broken. The barbarians obviously did not pursue material goals, because they threw the beaten head of the bronze boy near the turned monument.  On the night of August 27, 2012, the figure of Artyomka was torn from the pedestal. The unknown tried to drag the monument, but something seems to have prevented them. The police found the monument at a certain distance from the installation site.

References

Statues of fictional characters
Tourist attractions in Taganrog
Vandalized works of art in Russia
Monuments and memorials in Taganrog